The 1897 Notre Dame football team was an American football team that represented the University of Notre Dame in the 1897 college football season. In its second season with Frank E. Hering as coach, the team compiled a 4–1–1 record, shut out four opponents, and outscored all opponents by a combined total of 165 to 40.

Schedule

References

Notre Dame
Notre Dame Fighting Irish football seasons
Notre Dame football